Frank Reynolds (1923–1983) was an American news anchor and journalist for ABC News.

Frank Reynolds may also refer to:

 Frank Reynolds (academic), emeritus professor of history of religions and Buddhist studies, University of Chicago Divinity School 
 Frank Reynolds (artist) (1876–1953), British artist
 Frank Reynolds (field hockey) (1917–2001), British Olympic field hockey player 
 Frank Reynolds (editor), film editor on Praying with Anger
 Frank B. Reynolds (1874–1922), Justice of the Montana Supreme Court
 Frank Reynolds (It's Always Sunny in Philadelphia), a fictional character on It's Always Sunny In Philadelphia